Ardatov Urban Settlement is the name of several municipal formations in Russia.

Ardatov Urban Settlement, a municipal formation which the town of district significance of Ardatov in Ardatovsky District of the Republic of Mordovia is incorporated as
Ardatov Urban Settlement, a municipal formation which the Work Settlement of Ardatov in Ardatovsky District of Nizhny Novgorod Oblast is incorporated as

See also
Ardatov, several inhabited localities in Russia

References

Notes

Sources

